Antarcticimicrobium luteum is a Gram-negative, short-rod-shaped, mesophilic, aerobic and non-motile bacterium from the genus of Antarcticimicrobium which has been isolated from marine sediments from the Masan Bay in South Korea.

References 

Rhodobacteraceae
Bacteria described in 2019